Hampton Beach State Park is a  state park in the community of Hampton Beach, New Hampshire, United States. It is located on the southeastern edge of New Hampshire on a peninsula where the Hampton River meets the Atlantic Ocean. Ocean Boulevard (New Hampshire Route 1A) forms the western edge of the park.

The park has a large beach with lifeguards, playground, an amphitheater, public information services, public restrooms, pavilion, comfort station and first aid. Activities in the park include swimming, fishing, picnicking, and RV camping with full hook-ups in the campground.

References

External links
Hampton Beach State Park New Hampshire Department of Natural and Cultural Resources

State parks of New Hampshire
Parks in Rockingham County, New Hampshire
Hampton, New Hampshire
Beaches of New Hampshire
1933 establishments in New Hampshire